The name Alpha or Alfa has been used for three subtropical cyclones and one tropical storm in the Atlantic Ocean:

 Subtropical Storm Alpha (1972), pre-season storm that made landfall in Georgia
 Subtropical Storm Alfa (1973), briefly threatened Cape Cod but stayed out to sea
 Tropical Storm Alpha (2005), moderately strong tropical storm that made landfall in the Dominican Republic before being absorbed by Hurricane Wilma
 Subtropical Storm Alpha (2020), short-lived subtropical storm that made landfall in Portugal

Atlantic hurricane set index articles